Jessica Tejada (born ) is a retired Peruvian female volleyball player.

She was part of the Peru women's national volleyball team at the 1998 FIVB Volleyball Women's World Championship in Japan.

References

External links
http://elcomercio.pe/deporte-total/voley/jessica-tejada-frases-que-dejo-su-etapa-como-voleibolista-noticia-1963401

1971 births
Living people
Peruvian women's volleyball players
Place of birth missing (living people)
20th-century Peruvian women